Fariha Islam Trisna (born 13 September 2002) is a Bangladeshi cricketer who plays for the Bangladesh women's national cricket team as a left-arm medium bowler. In November 2021, she was named in Bangladesh's Women's One Day International (WODI) squad for their series against Zimbabwe, and in Bangladesh's squad for the 2021 Women's Cricket World Cup Qualifier tournament, also in Zimbabwe. She made her WODI debut on 15 November 2021, for Bangladesh against Zimbabwe.

In January 2022, she was named in Bangladesh's team for the 2022 Commonwealth Games Cricket Qualifier tournament in Malaysia. Later the same month, she was named in Bangladesh's team for the 2022 Women's Cricket World Cup in New Zealand.

References

External links

2002 births
Living people
Place of birth missing (living people)
Bangladeshi women cricketers
Bangladesh women One Day International cricketers